Alexandra Masson (born 2 July 1971) is a French politician from National Rally (RN) who has represented the 4th constituency of Alpes-Maritimes in the National Assembly since 2022.

References 

1971 births
Living people
 National Rally (France) politicians
Deputies of the 16th National Assembly of the French Fifth Republic
Women members of the National Assembly (France)
21st-century French women politicians

People from Nice